Géza Szigritz (also known as Tarródy, 18 January 1907 – 12 December 1949) was a Hungarian swimmer who competed in the 1928 Summer Olympics.

He was born in Krivány, Detva District and died in Eger.

In the 1928 Summer Olympics, he was a member of the Hungarian team which finished fourth in the 4×200 m freestyle relay event. In the 400 m freestyle competition, he was eliminated in the first round.

References
profile

1907 births
1949 deaths
People from Detva District
Sportspeople from the Banská Bystrica Region
Hungarians in Slovakia
Hungarian male swimmers
Hungarian male freestyle swimmers
Olympic swimmers of Hungary
Swimmers at the 1928 Summer Olympics
European Aquatics Championships medalists in swimming